Jacob and Hannah Leverton House, also known as the Dyott Farm, is a historic home located at Linchester, near Preston, in Caroline County, Maryland, United States.  It is a two-story side-passage-plan brick house with a gable roof constructed in the first quarter of the 19th century.  A two-bay, two-story frame wing was built in 1968 to replace the original -story wing.  It was the home of Jacob and Hannah Leverton, Quakers, who were agents of the Underground Railroad.

It was listed on the National Register of Historic Places in 2009.

References

External links
, at Maryland Historical Trust

Houses on the National Register of Historic Places in Maryland
Federal architecture in Maryland
Houses completed in 1820
Houses in Caroline County, Maryland
Houses on the Underground Railroad
National Register of Historic Places in Caroline County, Maryland